Jhooth Bole Kauwa Kaate is a 1998 Indian Hindi comedy film directed by Hrishikesh Mukherjee.  The film stars Anil Kapoor, Juhi Chawla, Amrish Puri, Reema Lagoo, Anupam Kher and Sajid Khan. The film was the last film of Hrishikesh Mukherjee as director.

Summary

Shankar, an actor of sorts, loves Urmila, but since Urmila is the daughter of a conservative and orthodox retired police officer Abhayankar, it'll take a lot for Shankar to win over the Abhayankar family. Shankar then begins to create a series of lies (hence the title, when he lies, the crow caws) in attempting to get the one he loves.

Cast
 Anil Kapoor as Ramanuj/Shankar
 Juhi Chawla as Urmila
 Amrish Puri as Mr Abyankar
 Reema Lagoo as Mrs Abyankar
 Anupam Kher as Rashid Khan
 Sajid 
Khan as Chunky
 Harpal Singh Thakur as Shanker

Music
Music was by Anand–Milind and lyrics by Anand Bakshi. Playback singers who rendered their voices are Udit Narayan (for Anil Kapoor), Abhijeet (for Sajid Khan), Vinod Rathod (for Anupam Kher), Shaiamak Davar (for himself), Parvez and Alka Yagnik (for Juhi Chawla). The soundtrack consists of 7 original songs.

Reception 
Nandita Chowdhury of India Today wrote, "Jhoot Bole Kauva Kaate has an old world charm but technically and artistically, the film is stuck in the '70s. The dialogues are stilted and Jal Mistry's cinematography often resembles that of a television sitcom." Sharmila Talliculan of Rediff.com wrote, ″The pace is fluent, befitting Hrishida's awesome reputation as one of the movie industry's finest editors. Even at the end, when the mood gets serious, the film does not jar. I found the climax very engrossing and laughed through the rest of the flick. There is always a comedy of errors in Hrishida's comedies, and the denouement arrives after much confusion. Jhoot Bole... maintains this tradition.″

References

External links

 
 

1998 films
1990s Hindi-language films
Films directed by Hrishikesh Mukherjee
Films scored by Anand–Milind
Indian comedy films